Patagonophorus is a genus of moths in the family Pterophoridae containing only one species, Patagonophorus murinus, which is known from Argentina and Chile.

References

Pterophorini
Monotypic moth genera
Taxa named by Cees Gielis